This is a list of years in Thailand.

16th century

17th century

18th century

19th century

20th century

21st century

 
Thailand history-related lists
Thailand